The following is a list of the monastic houses in Greater London, England.

Alphabetic listing

See also
 List of monastic houses in England

Notes

References

Medieval sites in England
Lists of religious buildings and structures in London
monastic houses
London
London